San Miguel Beer can refer to:

San Miguel Pale Pilsen, a Filipino beer produced by San Miguel Brewery
San Miguel Brewery, a beer producer founded in the Philippines and subsidiary of San Miguel Corporation
San Miguel Brewery Hong Kong, a beer producer in Hong Kong and subsidiary of San Miguel Corporation
San Miguel Beermen, a PBA basketball team owned by San Miguel Corporation
San Miguel Beermen (ABL), an ABL basketball team owned by San Miguel Corporation
Grupo Mahou-San Miguel, a Spanish brewing company